Mary Ann Mantell (née Woodhouse; 9 April 1795 – 20 October 1869) was a British fossil collector and the wife of the British paleontologist Gideon Mantell. She is credited – although this is disputed – with the discovery of the first fossils of Iguanodon and provided several pen and ink sketches of the fossils for her husband's scientific description of the Iguanodon.

Iguanodon discovery

Per the Mantells' account, it was Mary Ann who discovered the fossils which were later identified as belonging to Iguanodon; Gideon Mantell "at first endorsed but recanted" this story after their divorce; "doubt has been poured on the somewhat romanticized claim both on her involvement and the date ... with the suggestion that the Mantells probably bought the first teeth off local quarrymen." Per the Mantells' original story, in 1822, while Mary Ann Mantell was accompanying her husband in Sussex as he was visiting a patient, she discovered tooth-shaped fossils on the side of the road. She presented these fossils to him. Her husband then proceeded to send Mary’s fossils via Charles Lyell who brought them to Georges Cuvier, who initially told Lyell he thought the teeth were from a rhinoceros; he retracted that statement the very next day but all Lyell reported to the Mantells was Cuvier's initial dismissal of their discovery.

In 1824, William Buckland visited the Mantells and examined the fossil teeth; he concluded that they were from a giant saurian.  This encouraged the Mantells to send the fossils to Cuvier for another examination; Cuvier responded to the Mantells on 22 June 1824.

The most important remarks in Cuvier's response to Gideon Mantell were included in Mantell's paper published in the Philosophical Transactions of the Royal Society of London in 1825. Cuvier had written "These teeth are certainly unknown to me; they are not [from] a carnivorous animal, and yet I believe that they belong, given their little complication, their serrating on the edges, and the thin layer of enamel that revet them, to the order of the reptiles. The outside appearance could also be taken for fish teeth similar to tetrodons, or diodons; but their internal structure is very different from those of [that type].  Wouldn't we have a new animal here, a herbivorous reptile?" Cuvier had also pointed out in his letter to Mantell that "it is impossible that one day a part of the reunited skeleton will not be found with portions of jaws bearing teeth.  It is this last object above all that it is a matter of searching with the most perseverance." Mantell launched an excavation of the Tilgate Forest, which resulted in the discovery of the herbivorous reptile, the Iguanodon.

Contribution to husband's work
Mary Ann Mantell, like many women of the period in her position, made a "not-insignificant contribution" as "wife-assistant to her husband in collecting, illustrating and engraving." She drew up 364 detailed lithographs of the fossils for her husband's scientific publication The Fossils of the South Downs published in 1822, and in Illustrations of the Geology of Sussex published in 1827, in which Gideon Mantell describes the Iguanodon, thus named due to its likeness to the modern day Iguana. Gideon Mantell "was very proud of his wife's work" and emphasised the accuracy of his wife's depictions despite her lack of previous lithographic work, mentioning in his foreword that "as the engravings are the first performances of a lady but little skilled in the art, I am most anxious to claim for them every indulgence ... although they may be destitute of that neatness and uniformity, which distinguish the works of the professed artist, they will not, I trust, be found deficient in the more essential requisite of correctness." The discovery of the Iguanodon caused excitement amongst paleontologists it was the second largest reptile fossil to be discovered and the teeth of the Iguanodon suggested that the large reptile was an herbivore; whilst many believed that all ancestors of reptiles were carnivores, like the Megalosaurus, discovered by William Buckland in 1824.
 

Mantell's significant discovery in Regency England was largely ignored at the time, but has more recently been recognised and ranked alongside those made by other women such as Mary Anning of Dorset or Etheldred Benett of Wiltshire.

Family life 
Mary Ann Woodhouse was born on 9 April 1795 to George Edward Woodhouse and Mary Ann Woodhouse. In 1816 she married Gideon Mantell and lived with him in Lewes. Although initially she accompanied Mantell on his fossil collection trips, their marital relationship suffered and the pair became increasingly distant, causing their marriage to end in divorce. Gideon Mantell bemoaned this separation: "There was a time when my poor wife felt deep interest in my pursuits, and was proud of my success, but of late years that feeling had passed away and she was annoyed rather than gratified by my devotion to science." They had three children together, including prominent New Zealand scientist and politician Walter Mantell. Gideon was the primary caretaker of the children after the divorce was finalised. Except for brief visits in 1840 for the funeral of their second daughter, and in 1850 to Chester Square in London, there is no evidence the couple had any further association. Gideon Mantell was plagued with illness in his latter years and died in 1852 of an overdose of opium taken " medically to relieve pain". Mary died at her home in Cheptow Villas, Bayswater, London on 20 October 1869.

Notes

References

Sources
 
 
 
  
 
 
 
 
 
 
 
 

19th-century English women
Women of the Victorian era
1795 births
1869 deaths